Dancing on the Valentine is a Duran Duran video single released by PMI in the UK and Sony in the US in . It was released on VHS, Beta, Laserdisc, and Video8 (8mm) format.

Dancing on the Valentine is a collection of the three videos from Seven and the Ragged Tiger (1983).

The title comes from the lyrics of "The Reflex": "You gone too far this time / But I'm dancing on the valentine". The artwork was also highly influenced by the release of "The Reflex" single, earlier in the year.

A re-release in 1991 combined Dancing on the Valentine with the band's previous two-track Video 45, Duran Duran.                                Certified Gold by the RIAA( Billboard magazine week ending February 23, 1985 )

Track listing

Video 8: Sony Corporation of America – USA 

 "The Reflex" – 4:18 (Toronto)
 "Union of the Snake" – 4:12 (Sydney)
 "New Moon on Monday" – 5:25 (Noyers, Bercy, Paris)

LaserDisc (8-inch): Pioneer Artists/PA-84-M013 - USA 

 "The Reflex" – 4:18 (Toronto)
 "Union of the Snake" – 4:12 (Sydney)
 "New Moon on Monday" – 5:25 (Noyers, Bercy, Paris)

VHS: PMI / MVT 99 0012 2 - UK 

 "Union of the Snake" – 0:20  (Intro)
 "The Reflex" – 4:18 (Toronto)
 "Union of the Snake" – 4:12 (Sydney)
 "New Moon on Monday" – 5:25 (Noyers, Bercy, Paris)

VHS: PMI-Video Club / MC 2044 - UK 

 "Union of the Snake" – 0:20  (Intro)
 "The Reflex" – 4:18 (Toronto)
 "Union of the Snake" – 4:12 (Sydney)
 "New Moon on Monday" – 5:25 (Noyers, Bercy, Paris)
 "Hungry Like the Wolf" – 3:37 (Sri Lanka)
 "Girls on Film" – 3:30 (Shepperton Studios)

 1991 re-release

Duran Duran video albums
1984 live albums
1984 EPs
1984 video albums
Live EPs